Buffel might refer to:

 Buffel, a mine-resistant vehicle developed in South Africa
 HNLMS Buffel, early ironclad warship of the Royal Netherlands Navy
 NS Class 3400 or Buffel class locomotives
 Cenchrus ciliaris or Buffel grass
 Thomas Buffel, Belgian footballer
 Büffel, German armoured recovery vehicle